Ramabai (1750-1772), was the wife of Madhavrao Peshwa I. Her father's name was Shivaji Ballal Joshi from Solapur.

Biography

She had gone to Harihareshwar in 1772 when Madhavrao's health was very serious. She always kept fasts for Madhavrao. The couple had no children.

She was very spiritual and religious. She never intervened in social or political matters. She was described as a great person and caring for all. Though her mother in law Gopika bai peshwa, however, reportedly did not treat her well.

On 18 November 1772, Madhavrao died in the temple premises of Chintamani, Theur. Thousands of citizens visited the site and paid their last respects to their departed leader. 

After Madhavrao's death, Ramabai wished to perform sati. The peshwa family including Anandi Bai, Ragho Ba, and Narayan Rao tried to stop her but she didn't budge. Some sources believe that she had asked Madhavrao for his permission to perform sati before he died. on his funeral pyre on the same date. Madhavrao was cremated on the banks of the Bhima river which was about half a mile from the temple. 

A small memorial carved out of stone rests today at this place as a reminder of this great leader and his loving wife.

In popular culture 

 Ramabai Peshwa's character was essayed in a novel called Swami written by Ranjit Desai
 In the 1987 TV series, actress Mrinal Dev-Kulkarni played the role of Ramabai in a television series called Swami on the TV channel Doordarshan
 In the 1994 Hindi TV series The Great Maratha, Ramabai's character was portrayed by Madhura Deo.
 In the 2014 movie Rama Madhav, actress Parna Pethe played the role of Ramabai

Memorial

See also
Maratha Empire
Madhavrao Ballal Peshwa
Bhat family

References

External links

Peshwa dynasty
1760 births
1772 deaths
Women of the Maratha Empire
People who committed sati
18th-century Indian royalty
People from Solapur
18th-century suicides